The Miles City Waterworks Building and Pumping Plant Park is a National Registered Historic Place located in Miles City, Montana. It served as waterworks for Miles City from 1911 to 1974, and was added to the Register on September 26, 1979.

WaterWorks Art Museum
The building is currently being used as the WaterWorks Art Museum, formerly known as the Custer County Art and Heritage Center.

The museum features exhibitions of regional and national art and changing exhibitions drawn from its permanent collections. The collections include photos of area Native Americans, immigrant settlers and city builders prior to the 1950s, and a contemporary collection of regional art from the mid-1900s through the present. Art classes and outreach programs are offered for children and adults.

References

External links
 WaterWorks Art Museum

Government buildings on the National Register of Historic Places in Montana
Water supply infrastructure on the National Register of Historic Places
Former pumping stations
National Register of Historic Places in Custer County, Montana
Infrastructure completed in 1911
Museums in Custer County, Montana
Art museums and galleries in Montana
Buildings and structures in Miles City, Montana
Water supply pumping stations on the National Register of Historic Places